The El Castellar Formation is a geological formation in La Rioja and Teruel, Spain whose strata date back to the possibly the Valanginian to the Barremian stages of the Early Cretaceous. Dinosaur remains are among the fossils that have been recovered from the formation.

Vertebrate paleofauna 
Ornithopod tracks and dinosaur eggs are known from the formation.

Amphibians

Dinosaurs

Mammals

Correlation

See also 
 List of dinosaur-bearing rock formations

References

Bibliography 
  

Geologic formations of Spain
Lower Cretaceous Series of Europe
Cretaceous Spain
Hauterivian Stage
Valanginian Stage
Ichnofossiliferous formations
Ooliferous formations
Paleontology in Spain
Formations